Apterichtus moseri is a species of snake eel native to the northwestern Pacific Ocean where it is only known from Suruga Bay and the Kumano-nada Sea in Japan. This species has been recorded as reaching  TL for a female specimen.

References

moseri
Fish described in 1901
Taxa named by David Starr Jordan